Sh2-10, also called RCW 130, is an emission nebula in the Scorpius constellation.

References

Scorpius (constellation)
Emission nebulae
Sharpless objects